The Dutch–Scandinavian Economic Pact of 30 September 1930 was an economic agreement between the governments of the Netherlands, Denmark, Norway and Sweden. The agreement was designed to coordinate tariff policies and promote trade. The pact was a reaction on the growing economic crisis of the early thirties of the twentieth century.

See also
 Great Depression
 Oslo Agreements (1930)

Sources
 Nordic Trade Policy in the 1930s
 Barry Eichengreena and Douglas A. Irwin, Trade blocs, currency blocs and the reorientation of world trade in the 1930s, Journal of International Economics, Volume 38, Issues 1-2, February 1995, Pages 1–24

Treaties of Denmark
Treaties of Norway
Treaties of Sweden
Free trade agreements
1930 in Denmark
Interwar-period treaties
1930 in Norway
Treaties concluded in 1930
Treaties of the Netherlands
Denmark–Netherlands relations
Netherlands–Norway relations
Netherlands–Sweden relations
1930 in the Netherlands
1930 in Sweden